Amphilepis is a genus of brittle stars of the family Amphilepididae. It contains the following species:
Amphilepis antarctica
Amphilepis guerini
Amphilepis ingolfiana
Amphilepis mobilis
Amphilepis neozelandica
Amphilepis norvegica
Amphilepis nuda
Amphilepis papyracea
Amphilepis patens
Amphilepis pycnostoma
Amphilepis sanmatiensis
Amphilepis scutata
Amphilepis tenuis
Amphilepis teodorae

References

Amphilepididae
Ophiuroidea genera